"Baby, I'm Back" is a song by American rapper Baby Bash featuring vocals from Senegalese-American singer Akon. It was released on January 18, 2005, as the first single from Baby Bash's second studio album, Super Saucy (2005). The song was also used to promote the 2005 film The Honeymooners.

Music video 
A music video was released to promote the single. The video was directed by Jessy Terrero and produced by Josh Goldstein.

Commercial performance 
The song was a commercial success, peaked at number 19 on the US Billboard Hot 100 and number nine on the Billboard Hot Rap Songs chart. As of October 4, 2005, Baby, I'm Back has been certified gold by the Recording Industry Association of America (RIAA), for selling 500,000 copies.

Track listing 
 CD single
 "Baby I'm Back" (album version)
 "Baby I'm Back" (Dan Strong remix)
 "Keep It 100" (featuring E-40 and Bosco)
 "Baby I'm Back" (video featuring Akon)

Charts

Weekly charts

Year-end charts

Certifications

Release history

References 

2005 singles
2005 songs
Akon songs
Baby Bash songs
Song recordings produced by Akon
Songs written by Akon
Songs written by Baby Bash
Universal Records singles